
Gmina Czudec is a rural gmina (administrative district) in Strzyżów County, Subcarpathian Voivodeship, in south-eastern Poland.

Villages
Gmina Czudec contains the villages and settlements of Babica, Czudec, Nowa Wieś, Przedmieście Czudeckie, Pstrągowa, Wyżne and Zaborów.

Neighbouring gminas
Gmina Czudec is bordered by the gminas of Boguchwała, Iwierzyce, Lubenia, Niebylec, Strzyżów and Wielopole Skrzyńskie.

References
Polish official population figures 2006

Czudec
Strzyżów County